Secret Dreams and Forbidden Fire is the sixth studio album by Welsh singer Bonnie Tyler, released in May 1986 by Columbia Records as the follow-up to her fifth studio album, Faster Than the Speed of Night (1983). Three years in the making, Secret Dreams and Forbidden Fire was executive-produced by Jim Steinman, who had produced Tyler's previous album. Seven singles were released from the album, with "Holding Out for a Hero" originally being released two years in advance on the movie soundtrack album Footloose. Tyler's album featured collaborations with songwriters guest artists including Desmond Child and Todd Rundgren.

Secret Dreams and Forbidden Fire received generally mixed reviews, but was still a commercial success, reaching No. 1 on the Norwegian Albums Chart and peaking at #24 on the UK charts.

Background and release
Tyler and Steinman had already seen international success with Faster Than the Speed of Night (1983) and its highest charting single "Total Eclipse of the Heart". Steinman wrote four new songs for Secret Dreams and Forbidden Fire, two of which were released as singles. The first song to be released was "Holding Out for a Hero", released in 1984 for the Footloose soundtrack. The other, "Loving You's a Dirty Job but Somebody's Gotta Do It", was released as a collaborative single with Todd Rundgren in 1986.

Steinman recruited a number of other songwriters for the album, including Desmond Child. Steinman told Child that he wanted a song about androgyny. "I want a special song. The verses have to sound like Tina Turner, the B Section has to sound like The Police, U2, or Hall & Oates, and the chorus has to sound like Bruce Springsteen," he continued. Child used the verbal guide to write "If You Were a Woman (and I Was a Man)". He also wrote "Lovers Again".

"Ravishing" was originally written by Steinman as an instrumental track on The Wrestling Album (1985), titled "Hulk Hogan's Theme". Tyler also recorded "Under Suspicion" during the album's recording. It was written by herself, her brother Paul Hopkins, and Peter Oxendale. The song was used as the B-side to "Loving You's a Dirty Job but Somebody's Gotta Do It".

Critical reception 

Secret Dreams and Forbidden Fire received generally mixed reviews from music critics, with much of the criticism being aimed at music producer and hit songwriter Jim Steinman. Steven Wine primarily had criticism toward the length of the tracks, stating that "only Bonnie Tyler's parents would want to listen to her sing the same song for six minutes, but three of the eight tunes on [the album] exceed that span." He went on to describe the album as a "bombastic bore", only complimenting one of Steinman's penned songs, "Ravishing". Tom Ford of Toledo Blade stated that "although Tyler proves able to do some interesting things, she is outdistanced by the tiresome ponderousness of the material," concluding that "the prissy, self-indulgence here is just too much to stand." Paul Speelman of The Age opined that Tyler and Steinman were "deeply entrenched in a rut", and found the music to be excessive. "There are banks of synthesizers, layers of percussion, dramatic electronic gimmickry and huge production: no wonder poor old Bonnie had to yell to be heard above that lot," he said, praising Tyler's voice. "The fact that she manages to salvage at least a few tracks attests to her vocal fortitude." He argued that the album was a case of over-indulgence, noting the eight minute and thirty-five second length of "Rebel Without a Clue".

The album did receive some positive reviews as well. Jerry Spangler of Deseret News described the album as "a fine collection of tunes with good musical variety and a lot of energy." Doug Stone of AllMusic retrospectively stated that the album "depicts a cool portrait of '80s pomposity", but argued that with the album lacking songs like "Faster Than the Speed of Night" and "Total Eclipse of the Heart" from her previous album, Secret Dreams and Forbidden Fire becomes substandard to Faster Than the Speed of Night. David Hiltbrand of People complimented Bonnie Tyler's voice stating that "Tyler's bluesy roar has enough texture to take the gloss off Steinman's heavy pop arrangements", and "Tyler sings only in capital letters and Jim Steinman produces only at a full gallop pace!"

Singles
The album's lead single, "Holding Out for a Hero", had already been released in 1984 as a track on the movie soundtrack album Footloose. Following its initial release, it charted highest in Austria, Canada, Germany and Sweden, peaking at No. 19 in each country, but only No. 96 in the United Kingdom. The song was re-released in 1985 and charted at No. 1 in Ireland and No. 2 in the United Kingdom, where it was certified Silver by the BPI for sales of over 250,000 units.

In 1985, Tyler was recruited by Giorgio Moroder to record "Here She Comes" for the 1984 restoration version of the 1927 German film Metropolis. Following this, "Loving You's a Dirty Job but Somebody's Gotta Do It", a duet with Todd Rundgren, was released as the second single from Secret Dreams and Forbidden Fire; it could not follow the success of "Holding Out for a Hero" or "Here She Comes", but made the Top 10 in Portugal and the Top 40 in Switzerland, France and Belgium.

"If You Were a Woman (And I Was a Man)" was released as the third single in 1986. It was most successful in France, where it peaked at No. 6 and was certified Silver by the SNEP for sales of over 250,000 units. "Band of Gold" was released as the fourth single from the album, and the last to chart, reaching No. 81 in the United Kingdom. The last three single releases – "No Way to Treat a Lady", "Rebel Without a Clue"(made only number 162) and "Lovers Again" – failed to chart worldwide.

Track listing

Credits and personnel
Credits adapted from AllMusic:

Technical and production

Larry Alexander – mixing
Nelson Ayres – assistant engineer
Roy Bittan – arrangement, associate producer
Greg Calbi – mastering
Rory Dodd – arrangement, vocal arrangement
Neil Dorfsman – mixing
Greg Edward – mixing
Larry Fast – associate producer, programming
Ellen Foley – vocal arrangement
John Jansen – associate producer, mastering consultant
Don Ketteler – production coordination
Tom "Bones" Malone – horn arrangement
Sir Arthur Payson – mixing
Steve Rinkoff – engineering
John Rollo – associate producer, engineering
Todd Rundgren – vocal arrangement
John Philip Shenale – producer
Joe Stefko – drum programming
Jim Steinman – arrangement, direction, producer
Eric Troyer – vocal arrangement

Instruments
Roy Bittan – piano, synthesizer
Jimmy Bralower – drums, percussion
Michael Brecker – tenor saxophone
Hiram Bullock – guitar
Steve Buslowe – bass guitar
Larry Fast – synthesizer
Tom "Bones" Malone – trombone
Eddie Martinez – guitar
Sid McGinnis – guitar
Lenny Pickett – saxophone
Jim Pugh – trombone
Alan Rubin – trumpet
John Philip Shenale – synthesizer
Sterling Smith – drums, piano, synthesizer
Lew Soloff – trumpet
David Taylor – bass trombone
Max Weinberg – drums
Art Wood – drums

Visuals and imagery
Bob Carlos Clarke – concept, photography
Rick Haylor – hair stylist
Roslav Szaybo – designing

Vocals
Bonnie Tyler – vocal
Tawatha Agee – background vocal
Rory Dodd – background vocal
Curtis King – background vocal
Cindy Mizelle – background vocal
Todd Rundgren – featured artist, background vocal
Holly Sherwood – background vocal
Eric Troyer – background vocal

Charts

Weekly charts

Year-end charts

Certifications and sales

References

1986 albums
Bonnie Tyler albums
Albums produced by Jim Steinman
Albums produced by Roy Bittan
Columbia Records albums